Charmian Rosemary May (16 June 1937 – 24 October 2002) was an English character actress best known for her television and film roles. She appeared in the sitcoms The Good Life and Keeping Up Appearances, and the film Bridget Jones's Diary. She appeared as Miss Pershore in episodes 6 and 7 of The Fall and Rise of Reginald Perrin (1976).

She also appeared in The Worst Witch as Miss Pentangle, in Weirdsister College as Prof. Alicia Thunderblast, and she was Miss Milton in the Yorkshire Television series, You're Only Young Twice.

Amongst her stage work, May was in the original production of 84, Charing Cross Road at Salisbury Playhouse, and its West End transfer, in 1981. She also toured in the 1970s in a production of The Importance of Being Earnest by Oscar Wilde, playing Lady Bracknell.

Death
She died from cancer on 24 October 2002, aged 65. A service of thanksgiving for the life of the actress was held at St Paul's, Covent Garden on 23 May 2003.

Selected filmography
Among her many roles in a career of forty years were:

References

External links

Charmian May at the British Film Institute
Charmian May (Aveleyman)

1937 births
2002 deaths
English stage actresses
English film actresses
English television actresses
People from Purbrook
20th-century English actresses
Actresses from Hampshire
Deaths from cancer in England
21st-century English actresses
20th-century British businesspeople